The Thouron Award is a prestigious postgraduate scholarship established in 1960 by Sir John R.H. Thouron, K.B.E., and Esther du Pont Thouron. It was created to strengthen the "special relationship" between the United States and the United Kingdom through educational exchange between British universities and the University of Pennsylvania. Through the programme the Thourons sought to nourish and develop Anglo-American friendship by ensuring that, in the years to come, a growing number of the leading citizens of these two countries would have a thorough understanding of their trans-Atlantic neighbours. In the years since its founding, the Thouron Award has sponsored programs of graduate study for more than 650 fellows, known as Thouron Scholars.

Graduates of British universities receive support for up to two years of study – in any degree course – at the University of Pennsylvania, and Penn graduates may study at any university in the U.K. with up to two years of support.  The Award, among the most generous exchange fellowships in the world, pays tuition and a stipend that covers room, board, and such extras as entertainment and travel.

The Exchange Programme was set up to bring young people of exceptional ability from each country into contact with the ideas and peoples of the other country. The experience of sharing different ways of life, of studying in a new academic and cultural environment, and of confronting viewpoints and assumptions that have long and varied pasts, fosters personal enrichment and maturity and contributes to deeper understanding of the people and the traditions of each country.

The founders of the Award believed that recipients of the Award should be chosen as much for their personal abilities and leadership potential as for their scholastic ability.  Accordingly, Thouron Scholars are chosen on the basis of their "ambassadorial qualities" as well as their ability to succeed in their chosen academic programs. A primary goal in selection is find individuals who are deemed ready to represent their home country while being open to the different perspectives of the country in which they conduct their academic program.

One aspect of the Thouron Award which somewhat differentiates it from other fellowships is the close involvement of a specific family - the Thouron family, beginning with Sir John R.H. Thouron, continuing through his son Tiger and now his grandson Rupert. The family has welcomed every Thouron Scholar into what they deem to be their "extended family" by inviting them into their homes, entertaining them, and maintaining long-term contact with them.  This extended family, due to the diverse geographical spread of its constituents, is very much a global entity.

History of the Award
In the autumn of 1960, three British students, a geologist, an economist and a landscape architect, began their courses of study at the University of Pennsylvania as the first Thouron Fellows. In 1961, two graduates of the University of Pennsylvania arrived in the United Kingdom, an economist to the London School of Economics and a classicist to Balliol College, Oxford, as the first Fellows from the United States. Since that time over 500 Fellows have been selected.

Thouron Fellows have pursued degrees in a wide variety of fields. British Fellows have studied in all of the graduate and professional schools of the University of Pennsylvania. American Fellows have attended some 53 British educational institutions, with Cambridge, Oxford and the University of London attracting the majority of the Penn students. In the 50 years of its existence, the Thouron Award has played an influential role in the lives and careers of its alumni. As new Thouron Fellows cross the Atlantic each year to take up or continue their studies, it seems that the program of cooperation is growing and strengthening.

Thouron Prize
The Thouron family has also established a Thouron Prize for Summer Study at Pembroke College in the University of Cambridge for undergraduate students.  The award is granted to eight or nine rising juniors and seniors from Harvard, Yale, and Penn, with typically three students selected from each university.

The students receive a full scholarship to travel and spend two months studying at the University of Cambridge in the Pembroke-King's Programme. The Thouron Prize covers the full cost of the program. In addition, recipients are given a seminar series from Sir Roger Tomkys, a former Master of Pembroke College. Competition for the prizes is often fierce, and the universities typically have their own mechanism for initial nomination. Nominees are then passed onto the consideration of members of the Thouron family, who personally hold interviews with all the nominees before coming to a final decision.

The Thouron Prize is sometimes seen as the sophomore/junior analog of the Rhodes or Marshall Scholarships; however, the latter can only be applied to during one's senior year and typically cover two years of graduate study rather than one undergraduate summer.

Similar to the goals of the other British fellowships, the Thouron Prize endeavors to give undergraduates "an understanding of both shared and differing aspects of British and American culture." At least one student who won the undergraduate Thouron Prize later went on to win the graduate Thouron Award as well. At least two Thouron Prize winners have also gone on to win the Rhodes Scholarship.

Notable Thouron Scholars
 
Kenneth Baer – Director of communications, Obama’s Office of Management and Budget
Janice R. Bellace, after earning her undergraduate degree (Bachelor of Science in Economics] from Penn's Wharton School in 1974 and JD in 1977 from Penn Law, she used her Thouron Award (1977 through 1979) to  earn M.Sc. in Industrial Relations from the London School of Economics, and has been a  Wharton Professor of Legal Studies and Director of Penn's The Huntsman Program in International Studies and Business as well as founding President of Singapore Management University
Norman Blackwell – Head of the Downing Street Policy Unit
Francis Campbell – British diplomat
Jay Clayton, after graduating University of Pennsylvania summa cum laude with a Bachelor of Science in Engineering in 1988, used Thouron Award for post-graduate study in the United Kingdom from 1988 through 1990 where he received a Bachelor of Arts (promoted to a Master of Arts, per tradition) in economics from the University of Cambridge in 1990, and then graduated with a JD, cum laude and Order of the Coif, from the University of Pennsylvania Law School, in 1993, and, as of August 2020, is Chairman of the Securities and Exchange Commission
Sir Robert Cooper – British diplomat and political strategist
Hugh F. Durrant-Whyte – Roboticist
Sue Dyson - Renowned Orthopaedic Specialist Equine Veterinarian
Jennifer Egan – Pulitzer prize-winning author
Rick Gekoski – Writer 
Rose George - British journalist and author
Josh Gottheimer – Author, lawyer, speechwriter, Congressman for New Jersey's 5th congressional district
Hugh Gusterson – Anthropologist
 Simon Hirst – Former investment banker and CEO of Durlacher Corporation. Current Steering Committee member of Artisan Capital Ventures
Paul Judge - English businessman and political figure; benefactor of Cambridge Judge Business School
John J. Leonard – MIT professor
Frank Luntz - used Thouron Award (1984 through 1987) to earn DPhil in campaign technology from University of Oxford and, as of 2020 (after past stints teaching at University of Pennsylvania where Dr. Luntz earned BA in Political Science and Harvard University where he was a fellow at Kennedy School), he is teaching at New York University in United Arab Emirates and Verbum Dei High School in Compton area of Los Angeles  and also continues to be political and business pollster 
Terah Lyons – Founding Executive Director of the Partnership on AI
Justin Marozzi – British travel writer
Robert McCrum – British journalist and editor
John A. Moran, Esquire, after being educated at Trinity College Dublin used Thouron Award (1986 through 1987) to obtain LLM degree from Penn Law and certificate in business from Wharton School of Finance and went on to practice law at Sullivan & Cromwell LLP, and become: (1) CEO of Zurich Capital Markets, (2) CEO of Zurich Bank, (3) Head of Wholesale Bank Supervision Central Bank of Ireland, (4) Secretary General in charge of Department of Finance of Republic of Ireland, and (5) member of Board and Director of Risk Policy Committee of European Investment Bank     
 Sir Michael Jonathan Moritz, KBE – Billionaire Welsh businessman 
Brent Neiman – Professor of economics, University of Chicago
Peter Norris – Non-executive chairman of the Virgin Group
Philip Norton, Baron Norton of Louth, Professor at Hull University and member of UK House of Lords
David C. Parkes – Harvard professor of computer science
Adrian ‘Gus’ Pope, Esquire, after being educated at University of Edinburgh used Thouron Award (1985 through 1986) to obtain LLM degree from Penn Law and went on to become global managing partner and head of the  investment funds practice of largest law firm in Cayman Islands, Maples and Calder
Michelle Peluso – CEO of Gilt Group, former CEO of Travelocity
John Quelch – Harvard professor
Peter Roth, – High Court justice, after being educated at St Paul's School, London, reading history at New College, Oxford, used his Thouron Award (1976 to 1977) to obtain his LLM from the University of Pennsylvania Law School
Dick Sabot – Economist and Internet pioneer
Frances Stead Sellers - Journalist at The Washington Post
Omari Simmons – Professor, Wake Forest School of Law
Eugene Stelzig, Distinguished Teaching Professor of English Emeritus, SUNY Geneseo; literary scholar and poet
Richard Stevenson – Chief Washington correspondent, New York Times
Heath Tarbert - Nominee for Assistant Secretary of the Treasury for International Markets and Development for the U.S. (2017)
Sir David Watson – Oxford professor, principal of Green Templeton College, Oxford
Bee Wilson – British food writer

References

External links
 
 Brief biographies of the Award's founders

University of Pennsylvania
Education finance in the United Kingdom
Education finance in the United States